Roan Roberto Wilson Gordon (born 1 May 2002) is a Costa Rican professional footballer who plays for Portuguese club Gil Vicente and the Costa Rica national football team.

Career

Hometown club Limon FC
Wilson began at his hometown club Limón. At 13 he bet his coach  a car that he would make it to the professional level. He became one of the young players to earn the most playing minutes at the club. However after financial mismanagement and relegation the club was unable to function at the same level.

Municipal Grecia
Wilson was able to join Municipal Grecia on a free transfer in 2021. After a period of time to acclimate, such was Wilson’s form that he garnered interest from abroad, and a bid for his services from an unnamed Polish club was turned down in March 2022.

Move to Portugal: Gil Vicente
In January 2023 Wilson signed for Portuguese club Gil Vicente F.C. on a free transfer.

International career
Born in Costa Rica, Wilson is of Jamaican descent. He was called up to the Costa Rica national football team for the crucial 2022 FIFA World Cup intercontinental qualifying eliminator match against New Zealand in May 2022, which Costa Rica ultimately won 1-0. He made his senior debut on 3 June 2022 in a match against Panama.
He was called up to the final 26-man Costa Rica squad for the 2022 FIFA World Cup in Qatar. At the tournament, he played for a few minutes by entering as a substitute against Germany.

References

External links

2002 births
People from Limón Province
Living people
Costa Rican footballers
Costa Rica international footballers
Costa Rican people of Jamaican descent
Limón F.C. players
Municipal Grecia players
Gil Vicente F.C. players
Liga FPD players
2022 FIFA World Cup players
Costa Rican expatriate footballers
Expatriate footballers in Portugal
Costa Rican expatriate sportspeople in Portugal